Shawkat Akbar was a Bangladeshi film actor. His career in the Bengali film industry began in 1964 with the film Eito Jibon. He is considered one of the best co-stars of the film industry of Bangladesh. From 1963 to 1995, Shawkat Akbar performed over 250 films including Bengali and Urdu language films.

Filmography

Bengali films

 Notun Sur (1962)
 Eito Jibon (1964)
 Megh Bannga Rodh (1965)
 Milan (1964)
 Janajani (1965)
 Sat Rang (1965)
 Apon Dulal (1966)
 Bhawal Sanyasi (1966)
 Agun Niye Khela (1967)
 Janglee Phool (1968)
 Alor Pipasha (1969), director
 Momeir Alo (1969)
 Jibon Theke Neya (1970)
 Abuj Mon (1972)
 Chhutir Ghonta (1980)
 Mahanayak
 Beder Meye Josna (1989)
 Beder Meye Josna (Kolkata)
 Hangor Nodi Grenade - (1997)
 Shonkomala
 Avisap
 Sagor 
 Oporichita
 Boro Bou
 Ishara
 Fakir Mojnu Shah

Urdu films
 Talash (1963)
 Paisay (1964)
 Aakhri Station (1965)
 Bhayia (1966)
 Poonam Ki Raat (1966)
 Hamdam (1967)
 Gori (1968)
 Jugnoo (1968)
 Dil Ek Disha 
 Waiting room 
 Choloe Maan Gaye   
 Vaiya
 Berohom
 Shrife Hayat

Awards
 Bangladesh National Film Award for Lifetime Achievement
 Meril Prothom Alo Awards for Lifetime Achievement

References

Footnotes

Bibliography

External links
 

1937 births
2000 deaths
Bangladeshi male film actors